Deborah Chazen (born 1 September 1971) is an English actress. She is best known for portraying Annie in the BBC comedy The Smoking Room, Big Claire in Mine All Mine, and various roles in the BBC sketch show Tittybangbang. Alongside these appearances, Chazen has had recurring roles on Trollied  and Holby City.

Early life
Chazen was born in Hammersmith, London. After graduating from Manchester University in 1992 with a degree in Russian Studies, she trained at LAMDA.

Career
Chazen has appeared in the Mike Leigh film Topsy Turvy, Gimme Gimme Gimme, Mile High, EastEnders, Lucy Sullivan Is Getting Married, A Christmas Carol, and the 2001 version of The Life and Adventures of Nicholas Nickleby.

Her theatre work includes Mother Clap's Molly House at the National Theatre, Dick Whittington and His Cat at the Barbican Theatre, and Anton Chekhov's The Cherry Orchard in Sheffield. In 2006, she played Maribel in a new play called Crooked at the Bush Theatre, for which she received acclaim. An article in the International Herald Tribune compared the quality of her performance to the likes of Judi Dench and Maggie Smith. Another role that she played to great acclaim was Tessa in The Girlfriend Experience, which she performed at the Royal Court Theatre and The Young Vic.

Chazen appeared in two episodes of Midsomer Murders, one episode of Doc Martin, and in the 2007 Doctor Who episode "Voyage of the Damned". In November and December 2008, she played Milton's sister Susan in Another Case of Milton Jones on BBC Radio 4. She starred as Ruth in the stage show Calendar Girls from November 2009 to January 2010 at the Noël Coward in Leicester Square, during which time she was diagnosed with breast cancer and had to withdraw halfway through the run in order to start treatment. She made a full recovery and returned to Calendar Girls in the same role for a national tour at the end of 2010.

She had a running story line in Doctors in 2010 as Sissy Juggins, who along with her brother Ivor Juggins kidnapped Dr. Jimmi Clay, and was nominated for a Soap Award. She has also appeared in one episode of EastEnders as Minty's blind date and two episodes of Coronation Street as Miriam. She toured Calendar Girls from August to December 2011. In 2013, she appeared in the Sky 1 comedy series Trollied. She played Ludmilla in the play The Duck House, The show transferred to London's Vaudeville Theatre after a five-week tour.

Chazen appeared on television as Ludmilla in Ambassadors. In 2014, she appeared in the Sherlock episode "The Sign of Three", and on 19 June 2014, it was announced that she would be joining the cast of Holby City. She recently appeared as Jessica in Agatha Raisin and the Walkers of Dembley.

In 2017 she played Ruth in The Girls at the Phoenix Theatre in the West End.

Personal life
Chazen is Jewish.

Filmography

Film

Television

References

External links
 

English soap opera actresses
English television actresses
English stage actresses
Jewish English actresses
1971 births
Living people
Alumni of the University of Manchester
People from Hammersmith
Actresses from London
Alumni of the London Academy of Music and Dramatic Art